Kwun Tong Tsai Bay, or Yau Tong Bay, is a bay in Yau Tong, Kowloon, Hong Kong, situated between Kai Tsz Shan and Ling Nam San Tsuen and nearby Cha Kwo Ling and opposite to Aldrich Bay in Shau Kei Wan.

Since the 1960s, Yau Tong has been developed into a public housing area and an industrial area.

In late 1990s, Kwun Tong Tsai Bay was proposed to be reclaimed for development of private housing estates. But in response to strong opposition from the public, the proposal was turned down and replaced by decommissioning of shipyards around the Bay.

References 

Yau Tong
Bays of Hong Kong